Millville may refer to:

Canada
Millville, New Brunswick
Millville, Newfoundland and Labrador
Millville, Nova Scotia

United States
Millville, Arizona, a ghost town in Cochise County
Millville, California
Millville, Delaware
Millville, Florida
Millville, Illinois (Jo Daviess County), a defunct settlement in Jo Daviess County
Millville, Illinois (Adams County), a former settlement in Adams County
Millville, Franklin County, Indiana
Millville, Henry County, Indiana
Millville, Iowa
Millville, Massachusetts
Millville, Minnesota
Millville, Missouri
Millville, New Jersey
Millville, Sussex County, New Jersey
Millville, New York
Millville, Ohio
Millville, Mahoning County, Ohio
Millville, Pennsylvania
Millville, Utah
Millville, West Virginia
Millville, Wisconsin, a town
Millville (community), Wisconsin

Other 
 Millville, a house brand of the grocery store chain Aldi